Neil Berkett is a New Zealand-born England-based businessperson.

Berkett is currently the chairperson of Guardian Media Group, having succeeded Amelia Fawcett in 2013. He joined the board in 2009.

Berkett is active in NZEdge.com, an organisation that connects expat New Zealanders.

He attended Heretaunga College and the Victoria University of Wellington.

References

Notes

External links
Content on Guardian website

Living people
People educated at Heretaunga College
Victoria University of Wellington alumni
New Zealand businesspeople
New Zealand emigrants to the United Kingdom
Year of birth missing (living people)